Récardo Bruins Choi (born Choi Myung-gil; 3 December 1985, in Seoul, South Korea), later known as Roelof Bruins, is a South Korean-born Dutch professional racecar driver.

Youth
Choi was adopted by a Dutch family and arrived in the Netherlands at 4 months of age. He grew up as Récardo Bruins in the village of Zwartemeer near Emmen, where he started to drive mini go-karts at the age of 5. After his first learning years, practicing the basics of racing, he made the step to the karting competition races and drove his first races in the mini class for children from 8 to 12 years of age. This ended very well and in his first seasons of racing Bruins earned numerous of titles and prizes.

Career
After this he made the step to the junior class in which he also raced on international circuits. In his second year he received the title of national champion and later that year he stepped up to Intercontinental A class, the highest karting class in the Netherlands at the time. Proving to be quick, Bruins in his first year was already a competitor for the national title but due to a mechanic failure he eventually finished second in the championship and had to wait a year to win the title of national champion. After his major successes in his karting career, Bruins made the switch to formula racing in 2004. At the most important race of the season, the Marlboro masters, Bruins proved his worth by scoring a pole position, the official track record and a podium finish. After this success more podium finishes followed and at the end of the season Bruins managed a third place in the overall ranking of the Dutch Formula Renault 2.0 series. In 2006 Récardo stepped up to Formula Three racing, in the much faster and highly competitive German Formula Three Championship. Proving to be a quick learner, the Korean driver showed his speed by achieving podium finishes and promising results in his Formula Three debut season.
In 2007, Choi continued his career in another season of German Formula Three Championship, getting 2 pole positions, 2 wins and several podium finishes. He finished 4th in the overall standings.

In 2008 he was going to focus on getting a seat in the GP2 Series.

Racing record

References

External links
Official web page
Career statistics at Driver Database

1985 births
Living people
Dutch Formula Renault 2.0 drivers
Dutch racing drivers
Formula V6 Asia drivers
German Formula Renault 2.0 drivers
German Formula Three Championship drivers
Sportspeople from Seoul
Sportspeople from Emmen, Netherlands
Dutch people of Korean descent
South Korean emigrants to the Netherlands
Van Amersfoort Racing drivers
TCR Asia Series drivers
South Korean racing drivers
Nordic Formula Renault 2.0 drivers
24H Series drivers